The 2015 Notre Dame Fighting Irish football team represented the University of Notre Dame in the 2015 NCAA Division I FBS football season. The team was coached by Brian Kelly and played its home games at Notre Dame Stadium in South Bend, Indiana. They competed as an independent.

The 2015 Fighting Irish squad was arguably the most explosive offense that Brian Kelly has coached at Notre Dame. During the regular season, the Irish were one of twenty-one schools in the country to average 200 or more passing yards and rushing yards per game. The Irish had fourteen plays of over 50 yards during the season, which ranked 13th in the country and was a school record. They also had two touchdowns of over 90 yards, (a 91-yard touchdown run by C.J. Prosise and a 98-yard touchdown run by Josh Adams). The Irish only had two in the previous 126 years of Notre Dame football. The running game was dominant. The 5.76 yards per carry were fifth in the country. They finished the regular season averaging 34 points per game, including a 62-point effort against UMass, the most points in a game since 1996.

The Irish were defeated by Ohio State in the Fiesta Bowl by a score of 44–28.

Before the season

Previous season
The 2014 Notre Dame Fighting Irish football team finished the regular season with a 7–5 record. They beat the LSU Tigers, 31–28, in the 2014 Music City Bowl.

2015 NFL draft

Transfers out / departures
On May 19, 2015, QB Everett Golson announced he was transferring to the Florida State Seminoles football team to complete his college eligibility. Golson will be able to play immediately as he has graduated from Notre Dame. On June 11, 2015, sophomore defensive end Jhonny Williams announced his transfer from the university. Williams transferred to Toledo. Sophomore defensive end Kolin Hill transferred from the university, and headed to Texas Tech.

Transfers in
Avery Sebastian, a defensive back who previously played for the California Golden Bears, announced he would transfer to Notre Dame in June after he received his degree in May 2015. He would be enrolled in a graduate studies program while exhausting his final season of eligibility.

Coaching changes
The off-season brought a few changes to the coaching staff, as Notre Dame lost three assistant coaches to other opportunities: Kerry Cooks left the coaching staff to take the same position at the University of Oklahoma. Matt LaFleur departed to take the same position for the Atlanta Falcons of the NFL, and  Tony Alford left the university to take the same position at Ohio State University. Also, Outside Linebackers coach Bob Elliott moved into an off-the-field coaching role within the program. To replace their losses, Notre Dame welcomed the addition of four new assistant coaches. Mike Sanford Jr. former Offensive Coordinator/Quarterbacks coach at Boise State accepted the same position on the coaching staff. Todd Lyght, a former All-American at Notre Dame and Cornerbacks coach at Vanderbilt, accepted the same position on the coaching staff. Keith Gilmore, previously the Defensive line coach at North Carolina, accepted the same position on the coaching staff. Autry Denson, Notre Dame's all-time leading rusher and Running Backs coach at the University of South Florida, accepted the same position on the coaching staff.

Recruiting class
Brian Kelly received 24 commitments in his fifth full recruiting class including one five-star, Aliz'e Jones. The class included student-athletes from 13 different states.

During the season

On television
The 2015 Notre Dame Fighting Irish football team was featured in the miniseries, A Season With Notre Dame Football on Showtime, which premiered on Tuesday September 8, 2015. It followed Fighting Irish football players and coaches at University of Notre Dame in South Bend, Indiana. Each episode reviews highlights of every football game played during the current season of Notre Dame football. The series was narrated by actor and Fighting Irish fan Barry Pepper. The tagline was "It's more than just a game."

Personnel

Coaching staff

Roster

Schedule

Game summaries

Texas

Notre Dame would start the year out strong by beating the Texas Longhorns by a score of 38–3. Notre Dame quarterback Malik Zaire finished the game 19 for 22 for 313 yards and three touchdown passes. The Irish offense outgained Texas 527 to 163 and had 30 first downs compared to the Longhorns who had 8.

Virginia

While leading 26–14 midway through the third quarter, the Irish would lose their starting Quarterback Malik Zaire to a broken ankle. Virginia would take advantage, scoring two touchdowns in the fourth quarter to take the lead 27–26 with 1:54 left in the game. Irish backup quarterback DeShone Kizer would then lead Notre Dame on a game-winning drive. Kizer would convert a 4th and 2 with a four-yard run and then three plays later hit William Fuller with a 39-yard touchdown pass with :12 left in the game to seal the win for the Irish. It was reported after the game that Zaire would be out for the remainder of the season.

Georgia Tech

Despite being ranked higher than Georgia Tech in both the AP and Coach's Polls, Notre Dame would come into the game as underdogs, due to the injury to starting QB Malik Zaire. 19 year old quarterback DeShone Kizer would make his first career start. The result would be an impressive Irish win, 30–22. Despite the score, Notre Dame thoroughly dominated the game. Irish running back C.J. Prosise would score on a 91-yard touchdown run (longest in Notre Dame Stadium history) late in the fourth quarter to put Notre Dame up by a resounding 30–7 score. The Yellow Jackets would make a rally late, but it was too late and Notre Dame would hold on for the win. Kizer would finish 21 for 30 with 242 passing yards, one touchdown pass and an interception. Georgia Tech came into the game averaging 67 points a game and 457 rush yards a game, but the Irish defense would stifle them, holding them to just 216 rush yards and not allowing the Yellow Jackets to convert a third down until the fourth quarter.

UMass

Though Notre Dame would have just a 21–20 lead over heavy underdog UMass, the Irish would score 41 consecutive points to put the game out of reach. Notre Dame would accumulate 681 total yards of offense, 457 of it from rushing and would score 62 points. It was the most points the Irish would score since 1996, when they beat Rutgers 62–0.

Clemson

In a game where Notre Dame did everything it could to lose, they came just a 2-point conversion from sending the game into overtime. Down 21–3, the Irish storm back with three fourth quarter touchdowns, but failed to convert the 2 point conversion with :06 left in the game, and Clemson holds off the furious Irish comeback. Four turnovers and eight dropped passes (one which would've been a touchdown) doomed the Irish.

Navy

USC

Looking to get revenge after last years blowout loss to USC, the Irish would respond by defeating the Trojans 41–31. USC would get the ball first and score a touchdown. It was the third consecutive game the Irish allowed an opponent to score an opening drive touchdown. The Irish would return the favor with a 75-yard touchdown pass from quarterback Deshone Kizer to Will Fuller on their first offensive play of the game to even the score at seven. Later in the first, Notre Dame would block a USC punt and Amir Carlisle would return it for a touchdown. Notre dame would score 21 first quarter points, the most the Irish have scored in the first quarter against USC in the history of the rivalry. After taking a 24–10 lead in the second, the Trojans would score 21 unanswered points to take a 31–24 lead in the third quarter. In the fourth quarter, the Irish would take control and score 17 unanswered points themselves. Deshone Kizer's ten-yard touchdown pass to Corey Robinson would give Notre Dame a 38–31 lead, and put the Irish up for good. The 41 points the Irish scored against USC would be the most since 1977.

Temple

For this Primetime matchup, the Irish would travel to Philadelphia for a game against the 7–0 Temple Owls. For the first time in Temple school history, the Owls would host a top ranked team while ranked themselves. Despite Temple sporting the 14th best defense in the country, Notre Dame came into this game as double digit favorites. Notre Dame would outgain Temple in yardage 467 to 295, but turnovers and consistent miscues in the red zone by the Irish offense kept the game close. With 4:45 left in the game, and Temple leading 20–17, Irish freshman Quarterback Deshone Kizer would lead Notre Dame on a game-winning drive, finished off with a 17-yard touchdown pass to wide receiver Will Fuller. The game was sealed when Irish cornerback KeiVarae Russell intercepted Temple quarterback PJ Walker's pass with 1:09 left in the game. Deshone Kizer would finish the game with 299 passing yards and 143 yards rushing, including a 79-yard touchdown run in the second quarter.

Pittsburgh

Notre Dame's 12 point win is the largest margin of victory over Pittsburgh since 2005. Up until today, nine out of the last ten games were decided by 8 points or less.

Wake Forest

Freshman running back Josh Adams, who was fourth on the depth chart during the summer, broke off for a Notre Dame record 98 yard rushing touchdown. It was the longest play from scrimmage in the FBS this year and tied for NCAAF record for longest run by a freshman. Despite looking sluggish all day, the Irish were able to keep Wake Forest out of the endzone for the most part and win 28–7. Wake Forest had more passing yards, total yards, first downs and red zone trips than the Irish.

Boston College

Notre Dame's explosive offense would rack up 447 yards of offense against Boston College's defense, which was the #1 ranked defense in the country. But 5 Notre Dame turnovers kept the game closer than it should have been. Notre Dame's defense would only give up 88 passing yards, but failure to score in the redzone continued for the Irish, which leads the country in red zone turnovers with 15.

Stanford

In arguably one of the best College Football games of the year, a game that had ten lead changes and almost 1,000 yards of offense, Notre Dame's playoff hopes ended as Stanford kicker Conrad Ukropina hit a game-winning field goal as time expired. With 6:48 left in the game, and the Irish trailing 35–29, the Irish marched 88 yards in 15 plays (using up 6:18 of the game clock). The drive was capped off by Irish Quarterback Deshone Kizer's two-yard touchdown run to give Notre Dame the lead with just :30 left in the game. The Irish defense could not hold, however, as Stanford drove 45 yards in just 28 seconds to finish off the game with the win.

The Irish offense accumulated 533 yards of offense, 299 of those yards from rushing. The Irish had three scores of over 62 yards in the game. The first was a 93-yard kickoff return for a touchdown by C.J. Sanders. The second was a Deshone Kizer 73-yard touchdown pass to Will Fuller. And the third was a 62-yard rushing touchdown by Freshman running back Josh Adams. At one point in the second half, the Irish offense was averaging 11.6 yards a play.

The Irish defense left a lot to be desired though as they allowed Stanford's offense to have touchdown drives of 75, 78, 75, 76 and 74. And the most costly, allowing Stanford to get into field goal range with :30 left in the game. Stanford scored five touchdowns in five red zone trips.

Ohio State (Fiesta Bowl)

Rankings

Post season

Awards
All-Americans

References

Notre Dame
Notre Dame Fighting Irish football seasons
Notre Dame Fighting Irish football